Ambaris was the sixth attested ruler of the kingdom of Tabal in Anatolia, in what is now Turkey. He ruled from 721-713 BC and under his rule the kingdom annexed the neighboring kingdom of Hilakku, forming the kingdom of Bit-Burutash.

References 

Hittite kings